Arthur Crispien (4 November 1875 – 29 November 1946) was a German Social Democratic politician.

Biography 

Crispien was born in Königsberg (modern Kaliningrad, Russia) to August and Franziska Crispien. He worked as a house and stage painter in Königsberg and joined the Social Democratic Party of Germany (SPD) in 1894. He worked for a Health insurance fund and became the editor of the Königsberger Volkszeitung (1904–1906), the Danzig Volkswacht (1906–1912) and the Schwäbische Tagwacht in Stuttgart (1912–1914). In 1906 to 1912 Crispien was the regional Chairman of the SPD in West Prussia.

At the outbreak of World War I he opposed the Burgfriedenspolitik of the SPD on voting for German war credits and was dismissed from the Schwäbische Tagwacht. He illegally published the newspaper Der Sozialdemokrat (The Social Democrat) and was imprisoned for 6 months. He was conscripted in the German Army in 1916, joined the Independent Social Democrats (USPD) in 1917 and became its co-chairman and member of the Executive Committee. The Weimar era saw him elected a Member of the Reichstag in 1920. He subsequently rejoined the SPD in 1922 and became its co-Chairman.

From 1921 Crispien was a member of the executive board of the International Working Union of Socialist Parties and since 1923 a delegate to the Labour and Socialist International.
In 1920 he led a delegation of the USPD to the 2nd World Congress of the Communist International but refused to accept Lenin's conditions for participation in the Comintern.

Following the Reichstag fire in 1933 Crispien went into exile to Austria and later Switzerland, representing the Social Democratic Party in Exile. Crispien supported political and Jewish refugees from Nazi Germany and became a member of the Swiss Socialist Party. He was a delegate at the refugee conference of 1945 at Montreux.

Crispien died in Bern, Switzerland, on 29 November 1946, aged 71.

References

External links 

 
 Arthur Crispien in the Reichstag Members Database 

1875 births
1946 deaths
German anti-war activists
German Army personnel of World War I
German prisoners and detainees
Members of the Reichstag of the Weimar Republic
People from the Province of Prussia
Politicians from Königsberg
Emigrants from Nazi Germany to Switzerland
Social Democratic Party of Germany politicians
Weimar Republic politicians